Newport is an unincorporated community located within Downe Township in Cumberland County, New Jersey, United States. The area is served as United States Postal Service ZIP code 08345.

As of the 2000 United States Census, the population for ZIP Code Tabulation Area 08345 was 834.

Newport is a very rural community, with colonial, craftsman, and Victorian style homes. County Route 553 is the main road that runs through Newport. Many coastal roads (mostly dirt) were once used for the transportation of salt hay or Saltmeadow Cordgrass. Salt hay marshes serve as pollution filters and as buffers against flooding and shoreline erosion. It was harvested for bedding and fodder for farm animals and for garden mulch.

Two journals written by Erma Moncrief were utilized in the formation of a book titled Erma's Newport Journal with help from longtime resident Emily Stites. Stites died before the journals became the final copy. The book was completed by notable resident Emma Allen, in 2006, and was sold for $10.00. The library at Downe Township Elementary has a copy of the book.

There are two churches in the community of Newport; Newport Baptist, and Newport Methodist. Barnett's gas station and Newport Deli are directly on Route 553.  The Landing Restaurant sits on the bank of the Nantuxent Creek at the dead end of Landing Road. The Sundog Marina is next to The Landing Restaurant. The Delaware Bay can be reached by navigating through the Nantuxent Creek from Sundog Marina.

References

External links

Census 2000 Fact Sheet for ZIP Code Tabulation Area 08345 from the United States Census Bureau

Downe Township, New Jersey
Unincorporated communities in Cumberland County, New Jersey
Unincorporated communities in New Jersey